Ask Pickles was a board game made in the United Kingdom from 1948 by Tower Press, and popular in the 1950s. It consisted of two card games, "Ask Pickles", a quiz card game featuring film, television and radio trivia for 2-4 players, and "Happy Families". Named after radio performer Wilfred Pickles (1900-1978), the game had 29 cards with varying scores of 5 points (yellow), 10 points (red) or 20 points (blue).

TV show
Ask Pickles became a BBC Television show from 1954 to 1956, hosted by Pickles, similar to a later Jim'll Fix It. BBC publicity said of the show "It doesn't matter how old you are, you can still make your own special dream come true if you get in touch with Wilfred Pickles. Maybe you want to feed a lion or pat a giraffe on the tiny top of his head; or perhaps you'd rather see the lovely lights of London reflected on the Thames, or ride pillion on a motor bike. Maybe you want to meet a film star or you might even want to have a fight-all right! Just ask Wilfred Pickles. He'll try to fix it for you."

References

Quiz games
BBC Television shows
1950s British television series
1954 British television series debuts
1956 British television series endings
1950s British game shows